Nicolas Mayer-Rossignol (born 8 April 1977) is a French politician, the current mayor of Rouen.

References

|-

1977 births
Living people
Socialist Party (France) politicians
Mayors of places in Normandy
École Normale Supérieure alumni
Stanford University alumni
Corps des mines
Politicians from Bordeaux